The cheese antenna, also known as a pillbox antenna and a parallel-plate antenna, is a type of microwave-frequency radio antenna found in certain types of radar. The antenna consists of a suitable microwave source, almost always some sort of feed horn, positioned in front of a reflector consisting of a thin two-dimensional parabolic curve with metal plates on either side. The name comes from the resulting antenna looking like a segment that has been cut from a wheel of cheese.

Cheese antennas produce a signal that is highly focused in one dimension, and almost entirely unfocused in the other. The result is a broad fan-shaped (or sector) transmission pattern. These are used when the location in a single plane is desired, which is often the case for horizon-scanning radars seen on ships. The first example of the cheese was developed for the Royal Navy's Type 271 radar, allowing it to accurately measure the bearing to a target while having a wide vertical coverage so the reflection would remain in the beam while the ship pitched up and down in the waves.

Similar designs may also be found in height finding radars, with the antenna turned "sideways" in order to accurately measure the elevation angle. These are not widespread, as most height finders used a modified "orange peel" design to focus in azimuth as well, in order to be able to pick out a single aircraft.

While common into the 1960s, the use of slot antennas and phased array antennas has led to the cheese becoming less common.

References
 

Radar antennas